Ziegelman is a surname. Notable people with the surname include:

Jane Ziegelman, American historian
Gary Ziegelman, American singer